The Imperial German Army  Zeppelin LZ 39 was an O-class World War I Zeppelin.

Operational history

Extensively damaged on 17 May 1915 by Flt Commander Bigsworth. Three raids on the western and two on the eastern front, dropping  of bombs.

Bigsworth bombing
Flight Commander Arthur Bigsworth had already experimented with night flying, using two 4 V lamps attached to his aircraft and no doubt called on this experience on 17 May 1915, when he managed to climb his Avro 504 above LZ 39 over Ostend and drop four  bombs on its envelope, causing considerable damage. LZ 39 managed to return to its base, despite damage to five of its gasbags. For this feat Bigsworth was awarded the Distinguished Service Order (DSO). This was the first night-time attack on a Zeppelin. The attack and damage to the Zeppelin was reported on in the American press the same day it happened, 17 May 1915.

Last mission
On 17 December 1915, captained by Dr. Lempertz, LZ 39 was hit by shrapnel during an attack on Rovno. All rear gas cells were punctured and the front engine car was hit and later fell off. The crew abandoned the now-overstressed control cabin, dropped ballast and shifted loads to rebalance the ship and used an emergency control station in the rear to limp back to Germany. After the forced landing the ship collapsed because the material for repair and the supply of gas needed to refill the cells were not available.

Specifications (LZ 39)

See also
List of Zeppelins

Notes

References

 - Total pages: 480 
   - Total pages: 365 

 
 

Airships of Germany
Hydrogen airships
Zeppelins
Aviation accidents and incidents in 1915
Accidents and incidents involving balloons and airships